Jacques-Raymond Lucotte was an 18th-century French architect and encyclopedist.

A former student of the Académie royale d'architecture, Lucotte wrote the articles "maçonnerie", "marbrier", "marqueterie", "menuiserie", "mosaïque (art. méchaniques)", "plomberie", "pont, des machines", "fleuriste", "formier", "tourbissure", "ganterie" and "serrurerie" in the volumes IX to XVII of the Encyclopédie by Diderot and D’Alembert. 
He also provided more than 45 comments and over 650 drawings to the plate volumes.

Lucotte left two works:
 le Vignole moderne, ou Traité élémentaire d’architecture (3 vol., Paris, 1772–1784) 
 l’Art de la maçonnerie (Paris, 1783)

Sources 
 Frank Arthur Kafker, The Encyclopedists as individuals: a biographical dictionary of the authors of the Encyclopédie, Oxford, Studies on Voltaire and the eighteenth Century, 1988, p. 235-7. .
 Reed Benhamou, « The Sincerest Form of flattery: the professional life of J. R. Lucotte », Studies on Voltaire, n° 249, 1987, p. 381-97.

References

External links 
 Jean-Philippe Garric: Décadence de la théorie des ordres à la fin du xviiie siècle. ’Institut national d’histoire de l’art.
 The Encyclopédie of Diderot & d´Alembert collaborative project. University of Michigan Library.

18th-century French architects
Contributors to the Encyclopédie (1751–1772)